USS Anamosa (YTB-409) was a Sassaba-class harbor tug that served in the United States Navy from 1945 to 1978.
 
The Anamosa was assigned to the United States Pacific Fleet (1st Fleet, West Coast) soon after delivery to the Navy. USS Anamosa was deployed to Naval Station Guam by the beginning of 1948.

Anamosa was re-designated a district harbor tug, medium (YTM) in February 1962.

Her name was struck from the Navy List in May 1978 and she was sold for scrapping by the Defense Reutilization and Marketing Service (DRMS), 1 July 1979.

References
 
 Navsource.org

 

Sassaba-class tugs
Ships built in Brooklyn
1944 ships
World War II auxiliary ships of the United States